Craft service or craft services is the department in film, television and video production which provides cast and crew with snacks, drinks and other assistance.

Craft service workers are nicknamed "crafties" because they provide their services to the other departments, known as crafts, in a set. In the United States and Canada they are represented by a union, the International Alliance of Theatrical Stage Employees (IATSE). Other departments such as camera, sound, electricians, grips, props, art director, set decorator, special effects, hair and make-up, are referred to as crafts. Craft service is also an IATSE craft and the work is covered by a collective bargaining agreement.

Craft service is different from catering; craft service refers to the food always available to the crew while they are working, while catering is provided by a catering company or a restaurant and handles full meals.

Typically there is one main table where the snacks and coffee are set up (which is simply called "crafty" or "the crafty table").  Occasionally there are two craft service stations, with one being for cast and crew and another for non-union background actors. A "satellite" crafty may be set up next to the camera, as they may not be able to leave their workstations. In addition to snacks and drinks, the craft service department clears the set of trash. Aside from snacks and beverages, craft service may also supply bandages, aspirin, gum, antacids, toothpicks, hand sanitizer, sunscreen, and hand-warmers.

See also 
 Catering

References 

Film production